Social History is a quarterly peer-reviewed academic journal of social history published by Routledge. It was established in 1976. The editors-in-chief are Louise Jackson and Gordon Johnston (University of Edinburgh). Issues from 1976 until 2012 are available on JSTOR.

Abstracting and indexing
The journal is abstracted and indexed in:

 America: History and Life
 British Humanities Index
 CSA Worldwide Political Science Abstracts
 Historical Abstracts
 International Bibliography of the Social Sciences
 ProQuest databases
 Scopus
 Sociological Abstracts
 Studies on Women and Gender Abstracts
 Arts & Humanities Citation Index.

References

External links
 

Publications established in 1976
English-language journals
Social history journals
Taylor & Francis academic journals
Quarterly journals